Poškonys [poʃ'koːnʲiːs] (Polish: Paszki) is a village in Vilnius County,  southeast of Šalčininkai, Lithuania, in the so-called Dieveniškės appendix. While the inhabitants of Dieveniškės appendix are mostly Polish by ethnicity, Poškonys from the old days had a Lithuanian majority. The village itself belongs to ethno-cultural reserve and has an architectural monument status. The 2011 census recorded a population of 129 living in Poškonys.

References

Villages in Vilnius County
Vilna Governorate
Wilno Voivodeship (1926–1939)
Holocaust locations in Lithuania